Wroxall  may refer to:
Wroxall, Isle of Wight, England
 Wroxall Manor, Isle of Wight
Wroxall, Warwickshire, England
 Wroxall Abbey, Warwickshire